Luke Chueh (born March 7, 1973) is a Chinese-American lowbrow, or pop surrealist, painter. His works tends to be a juxtaposition of the cute with the macabre, including various self-portraits reimagining himself as a bear character.

Born to Chinese immigrants in Philadelphia, Pennsylvania, Chueh's family relocated to Fresno, California soon after his birth. Taught illustration at a young age, he became obsessed with interpreting the popular culture imagery he was surrounded by. Trained as graphic designer at California Polytechnic State University in San Luis Obispo, he was hired as an in-house designer & illustrator at the Ernie Ball Company in 1997. His work during this time garnered him several awards as well as features in the 1998 design annuals of both Communication Arts and Print. In 2003, Chueh relocated to Los Angeles where he started pursuing a career as full time painter. He posts regular updates on Facebook and Instagram.

Life

Early years 

Luke Chueh was born on March 3, 1973, and he is a first generation Chinese-American, both of his parents having immigrated to the United States from China. When he was three months old, Chueh's family relocated from his birthplace of Philadelphia, Pennsylvania to Fresno, California. At the age of four, his mother taught him how to draw Mickey Mouse, which began a childhood obsession to paint and illustrate renditions of his favorite things, mainly Star Wars and other "science fiction stuff that I was watching all the time."

After graduating from Clovis West High School in 1991, the 18-year-old enrolled into the Art & Design program at California Polytechnic State University in San Luis Obispo. Nearing the completion of his degree, one his professors confided in Chueh that he was "a mediocre graphic designer," but explained that he was "a great illustrator" and "should pursue a career in that", despite the fact that Chueh had a graphic design concentration and his "formal" art training was restricted to a "couple quarters of Life Drawing and Illustrations classes".

Hired by the Ernie Ball Company as an in-house designer & illustrator before receiving his bachelor's degree in 1997, Chueh primarily created T-shirt and advertisement designs for the brand. Several of these became award-winning, with the artist himself being featured in the 1998 design annuals of both Communication Arts and Print. During this time, Chueh began spending his nights partying, drinking, and doing drugs. In 2003, an addiction to painkillers resulted in his being fired, which spurred Chueh's relocation to Los Angeles with no job prospects.

Style and works

Artistic development 

His images have been remarked upon for their juxtaposition of cuteness with the macabre. "Traditionally, the sublime is described as the beautiful tinged with pain," said Steppling gallery director Sheila Dollente. "Chueh pares that idea to a single spare image borne by figures reminiscent of the soft, innocent stuffed animals of childhood. His paintings are at once intriguing, puzzling, friendly and sorrowful." His paintings and illustrations are noted for bringing together influences as diverse as Mark Rothko and Sanrio. Chueh draws inspiration from deeply personal experiences to popular culture, and has created works that stem from the intolerance he suffered as a child growing up as a Chinese-American.

In an interview with Art Prostitute Magazine he stated that he is influenced by his contemporaries utilizing strong illustrative elements. He mentioned Chiho Aoshima, Marcel Dzama, Jeremy Fish, Gary Baseman, Camille Rose Garcia, Barry McGee, Takashi Murakami, Yoshitomo Nara, Mark Ryden, and Ralph Steadman.

In his recent work, he has designed the album artwork for Fall Out Boy's album Folie à Deux (2008).

References

Sources

External links 
Official Site

American illustrators
Living people
20th-century American painters
1973 births
People from Fresno, California
Artists from Los Angeles
California Polytechnic State University alumni
21st-century American painters